SFZero or SF0 is a web-based community game invented in San Francisco. It is a type of alternate reality game.  SFZero players earn points by completing a wide variety of different tasks, often with a focus on creativity, exploration, community, or performance. Although the game was originally intended for San Francisco residents, its player base has expanded to include many other locales both in and outside of America.

SFZero is the creation of Ian Kizu-Blair, Sam Lavigne and Sean Mahan of Playtime Antiboredom, a "nonprofit organization dedicated to producing free immersive art games that use new technologies in significant ways."

Gameplay

Groups
In the early game, players were required to align with a group upon starting the game. This requirement was later lifted.  Currently, players can complete tasks from any group, and can choose to be listed as a member of any group from which they have completed tasks.

Each group has its own goals, interests, and an archive of group tasks.  Although SFZero encourages collaboration amongst all players, and many tasks require it as such, it also allows for competition amongst individuals, locales, teams, and groups. It is possible to declare other players both as 'friend' and as 'foe'.

Tasks
Tasks are created by the players, then performed by other players or groups of players, such as tipping in a non-tipping industry or creating a local urban legend. Players are assigned points based on votes from the community. SF0 features over 130 active tasks, with more than 1200 having been retired, and some 2500 suggested.

Events
The game also features Events in which players from all SF0 groups are invited to participate in a mass task. For example, the description for the event "The Sweet Cheat Gone" reads:

See also

 Cacophony Society 
 Psychogeography
 Dérive

Additional Coverage

External links

References 

Alternate reality games
Culture of San Francisco
Psychogeography